Isola dei Cavoli Lighthouse is an active lighthouse located on a 
small islet,  from Cape Carbonara, the southernmost tip of western Sardinia in the municipality of Villasimius on the Tyrrhenian Sea.

Description
The tower is painted with white and black horizontal band, the lantern in white and the lantern dome in grey metallic. The lighthouse is completely automated, powered by a solar unit and managed by the Marina Militare with the identification code number 1262 E.F. The lighthouse, being automated, it is no longer inhabited by the keepers consequently host the botanical and zoological research centre of the University of Cagliari.

See also
 List of lighthouses in Italy

References

External links

 Servizio Fari Marina Militare

Isola Cavoli
Isola Cavoli
Isola Cavoli
Isola Cavoli